The Okanagan Desert is the common name for a semi-arid shrubland located in the southern region of the Okanagan Valley in British Columbia and Washington. It is centred around the city of Osoyoos and is the only semi-arid shrubland in Canada. Part of this ecosystem is referred to as the Nk'mip Desert by the Osoyoos Indian Band, though it is identical to the shrublands elsewhere in the region. To the northwest of this area lies an arid shrubland near Kamloops.

Ecology 
The Okanagan shrub-steppe is defined by the presence of an antelope-brush ecosystem containing several species of flora and fauna found nowhere else in Canada. The South Okanagan shrub-steppe ecosystem is a habitat for 30% of the Red-listed and 46% of the Blue-listed vertebrates in British Columbia, with several listed as threatened or endangered. More than 24 invertebrates exist only in the Okanagan Desert, with an additional 80 species occurring nowhere else in Canada.

According to the Commission for Environmental Cooperation (CEC), this region lies within the northern reach of the Columbia Plateau ecoregion (10.1.2). It is defined by a dry semi-arid climate and an ecosystem of mixed shrublands and grasslands largely devoid of trees. Heading north, ecoregion gradually transitions into the Thompson-Okanagan Plateau ecoregion (10.1.1) around the shores of Skaha Lake.

Using ecoregions defined by the World Wide Fund for Nature (WWF), this region lies within the northern reach of the Okanagan dry forests ecoregion, which is defined almost identically to that of the CEC's Columbia Plateau ecoregion in terms of climate and defining vegetation.

Flora
The Okanagan shrub-steppe is dominated by antelope brush and common rabbitbrush interspersed with a variety of flowering plant species. These include arrowleaf balsamroot, bitterroot, brittle pricklypear, sagebrush buttercup, and sagebrush mariposa lily.

Fauna
As of 2009, 23 species were Red-listed (threatened or extirpated) in the South Okanagan shrub-steppe ecosystem, including: 
 burrowing owl
 western screech owl
 peregrine falcon
 sage grouse
 sage thrasher
 pallid bat
 western red bat
 badger
 tiger salamander
 western ridge mussel
 northern leopard frog

Threats and preservation 
Over the early 21st century, many fruit-tree orchards were converted to irrigated vineyards.

Local organizations 
There are multiple groups or organizations located in the Okanagan Desert. The Osoyoos Band, a First Nations government located in British Columbia, runs the Nk'Mip Desert Cultural Centre as part of its resort and winery complex, which is located on the east side of Osoyoos. The Osoyoos Lake Water Quality Society – which focuses on the impact and relationship of the South Okanagan shrub-steppe ecosystem with Osoyoos Lake – is a community public relations organization.

Proposed national park 
This region is the site of the proposed South Okanagan—Similkameen National Park Reserve.

Media 
The region was the subject of a 1999 National Film Board of Canada documentary Pocket Desert – Confessions of a Snake Killer.

See also 
Skaha Bluffs

References

External links 
Nk'mip Desert Cultural Centre
Osoyoos Desert Society
Osoyoos Lake Water Quality Society

Tourist attractions in the Okanagan
Geography of British Columbia